The Val d'Illiez is a valley in the Canton of Valais, Switzerland. It separates the northern foothills of the Chablais Alps from the Dents du Midi.

Starting from Monthey, the valley splits at Troistorrents:

Val d'Illiez itself with the villages of Val-d'Illiez and Champéry
Val de Morgins, between Troistorrents and Morgins

Villages
 Troistorrents
 Val-d'Illiez
 Champéry

Regions of Switzerland
Val Dilliez
Illiez
Landforms of Valais